Donald Everett Smith (July 27, 1920 – March 1, 1996) was an American professional basketball player. Smith was selected in the 1947 BAA Draft by the Chicago Stags after a collegiate career at Minnesota. He played for the Minneapolis Lakers in just the 1948–49 BAA season. He appeared in eight total games while recording six points and two assists.

BAA career statistics

Regular season

References

External links

1920 births
1996 deaths
American men's basketball players
Basketball players from Minneapolis
Chicago Stags draft picks
Forwards (basketball)
Guards (basketball)
Indianapolis Kautskys players
Minneapolis Lakers players
Minnesota Golden Gophers men's basketball players
Oshkosh All-Stars players
Roosevelt High School (Minnesota) alumni